Peter Moog (1871–1930) was an outsider artist with schizophrenia,  and one of the "schizophrenic masters" profiled by Hans Prinzhorn in his field-defining work Artistry of the Mentally Ill.

Moog became a waiter and later a tavern owner, getting married in 1900 to a woman with whom he had three children. Throughout his life, he had been prone to a "loose life style, alcoholism, and sexual excess" (Prinzhorn 1972, p. 144) and had gonorrhea. He had his first schizophrenic episode in 1908, shortly after his wife's death in 1907.

His episode convinced him to become a poet, and he drifted from town to town attempting to give lectures and start his own printing press. Six weeks afterward, his relatives finally committed him to an asylum. In the asylum he wrote lewd poetry, starting to paint in 1912. In a surprising contrast to his verses, all of his paintings were of saints and religious images.

The style of his paintings is reminiscent of a stained glass window. Figures are composed of many narrow strips, each decorated with its own ornamental pattern and each of a different color. Moog displays the common outsider horror vacui, filling every space with decoration.

He painted saints in order to atone for his earlier sins, and renounced his earlier lifestyle, equating sexuality with sin and renouncing tobacco and alcohol during his years in the asylum.

Resources

 Prinzhorn, Hans. Artistry of the mentally ill: a contribution to the psychology and psychopathology of configuration. Trans. Eric von Brockdorff.   New York, NY: Springer-Verlag, 1972. .

1871 births
1930 deaths
Drinking establishment owners
Outsider artists
People with schizophrenia
19th-century German painters
19th-century German male artists
20th-century German painters
20th-century German male artists
German male painters